The NASA AD-1 was both an aircraft and an associated flight test program conducted between 1979 and 1982 at the NASA Dryden Flight Research Center, Edwards California, which successfully demonstrated an aircraft wing that could be pivoted obliquely from zero to 60 degrees during flight.

The unique oblique wing was demonstrated on a small, subsonic jet-powered research aircraft called the AD-1 (Ames-Dryden-1). The aircraft was flown 79 times during the research program, which evaluated the basic pivot-wing concept and gathered information on handling qualities and aerodynamics at various speeds and degrees of pivot.

Project background

The first known oblique wing design was the Blohm & Voss P.202, proposed by Richard Vogt in 1942. The oblique wing concept was later promoted by Robert T. Jones, an aeronautical engineer at NASA's Ames Research Center, Moffett Field, California. Analytical and wind tunnel studies Jones initiated at Ames indicated that a transport-size oblique-wing aircraft, flying at speeds up to Mach 1.4, would have substantially better aerodynamic performance than aircraft with more conventional wings. At high speeds, both subsonic and supersonic, the wing would be pivoted at up to 60 degrees to the aircraft's fuselage for better high-speed performance. The studies showed these angles would decrease aerodynamic drag, permitting increased speed and longer range with the same fuel expenditure. At lower speeds, during takeoffs and landings, the wing would be perpendicular to the fuselage like a conventional wing to provide maximum lift and control qualities. As the aircraft gained speed, the wing would be pivoted to increase the oblique angle, thereby reducing the drag and decreasing fuel consumption. The wing could only be swept in one direction, with the right wingtip moving forward.

Aircraft
The AD-1 aircraft was delivered to Dryden in February 1979. The Ames Industrial Co., Bohemia, New York, constructed it, under a US$240,000  fixed-price contract. NASA specified the overall vehicle design using a geometric configuration studied by Boeing Commercial Airplanes, Seattle, Washington. The Rutan Aircraft Factory, Mojave, California, provided the detailed design and load analysis for the intentionally low-speed, low-cost aircraft (there, the aircraft was known internally as the Model 35). The low speed and cost, of course, limited the complexity of the vehicle and the scope of its technical objectives.

Piloting the aircraft on its first flight December 21, 1979, was NASA research pilot Thomas C. McMurtry, who was also the pilot on the final flight August 7, 1982. Another well-known test pilot involved in the project was Pete Knight.

The AD-1 was powered by two small Microturbo TRS18-046 turbojet engines, each producing  of static thrust at sea level. These were essentially the same engines used in the BD-5J.

It was constructed of plastic reinforced with fiberglass, in a sandwich with the skin separated by a rigid foam core.

A fixed tricycle landing gear, mounted close to the fuselage to lessen aerodynamic drag, gave the aircraft a very "squatty" appearance on the ground. The wing was pivoted by an electrically-driven gear mechanism located inside the fuselage, just forward of the engines.

Flight research

The research program to validate the oblique wing concept was typical of any NASA high-risk project — to advance through each test element and expand the operating envelope, methodically and carefully. The basic purpose of the AD-1 project was to investigate the low-speed characteristics of an oblique-wing configuration.

The AD-1 made its first flight late in 1979. The wing was pivoted incrementally over the next 18 months until the full 60-degree angle was reached in mid-1981. The aircraft continued to be flown for another year, obtaining data at various speeds and wing-pivot angles until the final flight in August 1982.

The final flight of the AD-1 did not occur at Dryden, however, but at the Experimental Aircraft Association's (EAA) annual exhibition at Oshkosh, Wisconsin, where it was flown eight times to demonstrate its unique configuration.

Following the flight research, Jones still considered the oblique wing as a viable lift concept for large transoceanic or transcontinental transports. This particular low-speed, low-cost research vehicle, however, exhibited aeroelastic and pitch-roll-coupling effects that contributed to poor handling qualities at sweep angles above 45 degrees. The fiberglass structure limited wing stiffness that would have improved the aircraft's handling qualities, as an improved (and thus more expensive) control system would also have done.

Thus, although the AD-1 structure allowed completion of the program's technical objectives, there was still a need for a transonic oblique-wing research aircraft to assess the effects of compressibility, evaluate a more representative structure, and analyze flight performance at transonic speeds (those on either side of the speed of sound).

After completion of the test program, the AD-1 was retired and is now on exhibit in the Hiller Aviation Museum in San Carlos, California.

Specifications

See also

References

Citations

Bibliography

 AD-1 Construction Completed, Dryden X-Press, February 23, 1979, p. 2.
 Robert E. Curry and Alex G. Sim, In-Flight Total Forces, Moments, and Static Aeroelastic Characteristics of an Oblique-Wing Research Airplane (Edwards, CA: NASA TP-2224, 1984)
 Robert E. Curry and Alexander G. Sim, The Unique Aerodynamic Characteristics of the AD-1 Oblique-Wing Research Airplane, AIAA paper 82-1329 presented at the AIAA 9th Atmospheric Flight Mechanics Conference, Aug. 9–11, 1982, San Diego, CA
 Flight logs for the AD-1 in the NASA Dryden Historical Reference Collection.
 Thomas C. McMurtry, A. G. Sim, and W. H. Andrews, AD-1 Oblique Wing Aircraft Program, AIAA paper 81-2354 presented at the AIAA/SETP/SFTE/ASE/ITEA/IEEE 1st Flight Testing Conference, Nov. 11–13, 1981, Las Vegas, NV.
 Alex G. Sim and Robert E. Curry, Flight Characteristics of the AD-1 Oblique-Wing Research Airplane, (Edwards, CA: NASA TP-2223, 1985)
 Alex G. Sim and Robert E. Curry, Flight-Determined Aerodynamic Derivatives of the AD-1 Oblique-Wing Research Aircraft (Edwards, CA: NASA TP-2222, 1984)
 
 Taylor, John W. R. Jane's All The World's Aircraft 1980-81. London:Jane's Publishing, 1980. .

External links

 NASA Dryden AD-1 Fact Sheet

AD-1
1970s United States experimental aircraft
Oblique-wing aircraft
NASA aircraft
Rutan aircraft
Ames Industrial aircraft
High-wing aircraft
Aircraft first flown in 1979
Twinjets